The 1987–88 John Player Special Cup was the 17th edition of England's premier rugby union cup competition. Harlequins won the competition, for the first time, defeating Bristol in the final at Twickenham Stadium. The competition was sponsored by John Player cigarettes.

First round

Second round

Third round

Fourth round

Quarter-finals

Semi-finals 

(aet, 80 mins 16 – 16)

Final

Records 
 The attendance for the final of 37,000 was highest in the competition's history
 Bath's unbeaten sequence of 22 matches ended when Moseley beat them in a quarter-final at The Reddings

Sponsorship 
The competition was sponsored, for the last time, by John Player and the prize money was £125,000 (an increase of £15,000). Both finalists received £3,750 each and in thirteen years of sponsorship over £1 million has been provided.

References 

1987-88
1987–88 rugby union tournaments for clubs
1987–88 in English rugby union